Dewantara is a district in North Aceh Regency, Aceh, Indonesia. The capital of this district is Krueng Geukuh. There are a few companies in this district, such as PT.Arun, PT.Pupuk Iskandar Muda, and PT.AAF.

Dewantara has 15 villages, namely:
 Bangka Jaya
 Bluka Teubai
 Geulumpang Sulu Barat
 Geulumpang Sulu Timur
 Keude Krueng Geukeuh
 Lancang Barat
 Paloh Gadeng
 Paloh Igeuh
 Paloh Lada
 Pulo Rungkom
 Tambon Baroh
 Tambon Tunong
 Ulee Pulo
 Ulee Reuleung
 Uteun Geulinggang

North Aceh Regency
Districts of Aceh